Ivo Niederle (26 December 1929 – 8 January 2021) was a Czech actor, entertainer, and commentator.

Biography 
Niederle was born in 1929 in Prague. In 1953, he graduated in acting studies from the Theatre Faculty of the Academy of Performing Arts in Prague, until 1957 he played in the regional theater in Teplice, from 1957 he worked in the Werich , which in 1962 was transferred to the Municipal Theaters of Prague, where he played until the time of his retirement in 1991. During his life, he played in many film and television roles. Niederle also worked as a television commentator, entertainer and presenter.

References

External links
 

1929 births
2021 deaths
Male actors from Prague
20th-century Czech male actors
Academy of Performing Arts in Prague alumni
Czech male film actors
Czech male television actors
Czech male stage actors